The ProSpeed was a line of laptop computers developed by NEC in 1988. It was introduced simultaneously with their slimmer and less heavy UltraLite line of notebook computers. The i386SX-equipped CSX model, released in September 1989, was the first laptop with a color LCD. It was also one of the first laptops with to be offered with a docking station. The CSX model was featured on the front cover of PC Magazine.

Models

References

Computer-related introductions in 1988
ProSpeed